Beef Stroganoff or Beef Stroganov is a Russian dish of sautéed pieces of beef in a sauce of mustard and smetana (sour cream). From its origins in mid-19th-century Russian Empire, in Odessa that is currently Ukraine, it has become popular around the world, with considerable variation from the original recipe. Mushrooms are common in many variants.

History
The dish is named after one of the members of the influential Stroganov family. A legend attributes its invention to French chefs working for the family, but several researchers point out that the recipe is a refined version of older Russian dishes.

Elena Molokhovets's classic Russian cookbook A Gift to Young Housewives gives the first known recipe for Govjadina po-strogonovski, s gorchitseju, "Beef à la Stroganov, with mustard", in its 1871 edition. The recipe involves beef cubes (not strips) prepared in a dry marinade of salt and allspice, and then sautéed in butter. The sauce is a simple roux mixed with prepared mustard and broth, and finished with a small amount of sour cream: no onions, no mushrooms and no alcohol.

In 1891, the French chef Charles Brière, who was working in Saint Petersburg, submitted a recipe for beef Stroganoff to a competition sponsored by the French magazine L'Art culinaire. This led Larousse Gastronomique to assume that he was the inventor of this dish, but both the recipe and the name existed before then.

Another recipe, this one from 1909, adds onions and tomato sauce, and serves it with crisp potato straws, which are considered the traditional side dish for beef Stroganoff in Russia.  The version given in the 1938 Larousse Gastronomique includes beef strips, and onions, with either mustard or tomato paste optional.

After the fall of Tsarist Russia, the recipe was popularly served in the hotels and restaurants of China before the start of World War II. Russian and Chinese immigrants, as well as US servicemen stationed in pre-Communist China, brought several variants of the dish to the United States, which may account for its popularity during the 1950s. It came to Hong Kong in the late fifties, with Russian restaurants and hotels serving the dish with rice but not sour cream.

In 1960s United States, several manufacturers introduced dehydrated beef stroganoff mixes, which were mixed with cooked beef and sour cream. It was also available freeze-dried for campers.

Around the world

Beef Stroganoff preparation varies significantly not only based on geography, but based on other factors as well, such as the cut of meat and seasonings selected. Meat for the dish can be cut in different ways and is sometimes diced, cubed, or cut into strips. Some variations include mushrooms and onions or other vegetables and varied seasonings such as sugar, salt, black pepper, and bottled marinades (especially Worcestershire sauce) and rubs.

In the version often prepared in the United States today in restaurants and hotels, it consists of strips of beef filet with a mushroom, onion, and sour cream sauce, and is served over rice or noodles. Today, the dish is generally served over wide or twisted egg noodles in the United States. British pubs usually serve a version of the dish with a creamy white wine sauce, whereas more "authentic" versions are often red stews with a scoop of sour cream separately served on top.

Larousse Gastronomique lists Stroganoff as a cream, paprika, veal stock and white wine recipe.
The Brazilian variant includes diced beef or strips of beef (usually filet mignon) with tomato sauce, onions, mushrooms and heavy cream. Brazilians also prepare Stroganoff with chicken or even shrimp instead of beef. It is commonly served with a side of shoe-string potatoes and white rice. In Brazilian Portuguese it is called Strogonoff or Estrogonofe.

Stroganoff is also popular in Nordic countries. In Sweden, a common variant is korv Stroganoff (sausage Stroganoff; sv), which uses the local falukorv sausage as a substitute for the beef.  In Finland, the dish is called makkara-stroganoff, makkara meaning any kind of sausage. Beef Stroganoff is, however, also a common dish. Diced brined pickles are also a normal ingredient in Finnish Stroganoff.

Stroganoff's popularity extends to Japan, where it is most commonly served with white rice, or white rice seasoned with parsley and butter.  Its popularity increased dramatically with the introduction of "instant sauce cubes" from S&B Foods.  These are cubes with dried seasoning and thickening agents that can be added to water, onion, beef, and mushrooms to make a Stroganoff-style sauce.  Additionally, Japanese home recipes for Stroganoff frequently call for ingredients that are outside of Russian tradition, such as small amounts of soy sauce.

See also

 List of beef dishes
 List of foods named after people
 List of Russian dishes

Notes

External links

 The Food Timeline has some quotes about the dish.

Russian cuisine
Soviet cuisine
Beef dishes
Meat stews